India sent a delegation to compete at the 2008 Summer Paralympics in Beijing, People's Republic of China. According to official records, five athletes (all male) competed in athletics, powerlifting and shooting. India did not win a medal at these Games.

Athletics

Men

Jagseer Singh improved steadily with each of his attempts, recording a 6.4m leap in his 5th attempt to finish 7th overall in the Long Jump event. Though he finished a fair way back, the distance between him and the winners was eventually barely a few centimeters with David Roos the silver medalist jumping 6.64m and Kangyong Li of China the bronze medalist leaping 6.61m.

Powerlifting

Men

Shooting

Men

See also
India at the Paralympics
India at the 2008 Summer Olympics

References

External links
International Paralympic Committee

Nations at the 2008 Summer Paralympics
2008
Summer Paralympics